Paraguay and its member station Canal 13 Paraguay (Now Red Paraguaya de Comunicación RPC), debuted in the OTI Festival in its seventh edition, which was held in Santiago in 1978. The first Paraguayan representative in the contest was the veteran Rolando Percy, who got a disappointing 18th place with zero points. The same singer would return to the event in 1990 and 1995 with disappointing placings.

Since their debut, the Guarani country participated almost uninterruptedly except in 1982, their only withdrawal from the contest.

History 
Just like the most of the participating countries and broadcasters in the OTI Festival, Canal 13 Paraguay selected its entrants internally. Their participants in the contest were not very successful, but in 1981, the country reached the top 10 for first time with Alberto de Luque and his song "Vos y yo seremos todos" (You and me will be everybody) which placed 8th.

After a withdrawal in 1982, the next year in Washington, D.C., Paraguay recorded one of its most successful participations with the folk singer Marco de Brix and his song "Soñaremos como ayer" (We will dream just like yesterday) which placed fourth after receiving a warm welcome by the members of the jury. The same singer, five years later, returned to the event in 1988 in Buenos Aires with his song "Un mundo diferente" (A different world) which was even more successful than his previous entry achieving second place with 25 points. Since then, the South American country never managed to reach the top 10 again.

Contestants

References 

OTI Festival
Paraguay